Mario Alfredo Salas Saieg (born 11 October 1967) is a former Chilean football midfielder and current manager. He earned five caps for the Chile national team, scoring no goals between 1993 and 1997.

Salas made his debut in 1993 in a friendly match against Spain in Alicante. He started his managerial career at Barnechea in 2009. In 2011, he won the Tercera División de Chile title and the promotion to Primera B. In 2012, he was appointed as head coach of the Chile U20 national team after the resignation of Fernando Carvallo.

He completed his BA in Physical education at the Pontifical Catholic University of Valparaíso.

Managerial statistics

Honours

Footballer

Club
Unión Española
 Copa Chile (1): 1993

Colo-Colo
 Primera División de Chile (3): 1996, 1997 Clausura, 1998
 Copa Chile (1): 1996

Manager

Club
Barnechea
 Tercera División (1): 2011

Universidad Católica
 Primera División de Chile (2): 2016 Clausura, 2016 Apertura
 Supercopa de Chile (1): 2016

Sporting Cristal
 Peruvian Primera División (1): 2018

Colo-Colo
 Copa Chile (1): 2019

References

External links
 

1967 births
Living people
Footballers from Santiago
Chilean people of Palestinian descent
Pontifical Catholic University of Valparaíso alumni
Chilean footballers
Chile international footballers
1997 Copa América players
Everton de Viña del Mar footballers
Unión Española footballers
Club Deportivo Palestino footballers
Colo-Colo footballers
Santiago Morning footballers
Santiago Wanderers footballers
C.D. Antofagasta footballers
Chilean Primera División players
Primera B de Chile players
Association football midfielders
Chilean football managers
Chilean expatriate football managers
Chile national under-20 football team managers
Huachipato managers
Club Deportivo Universidad Católica managers
Sporting Cristal managers
Colo-Colo managers
Club Alianza Lima managers
Wadi Degla SC managers
Primera B de Chile managers
Chilean Primera División managers
Peruvian Primera División managers
Egyptian Premier League managers
Chilean expatriate sportspeople in Peru
Chilean expatriate sportspeople in Egypt
Expatriate football managers in Peru
Expatriate football managers in Egypt